André Le Dissez (11 November 1929 – 4 May 2018) was a French professional road bicycle racer.

Major results

1957
Méry
1958
Saint-Renan
Treignac
1959
Tour de France:
Winner stage 14
1961
Plevez
1964
Polymultipliée
Sévignac

References

External links 

Official Tour de France results for André Le Dissez

1929 births
2018 deaths
French male cyclists
French Tour de France stage winners
Sportspeople from Finistère
Cyclists from Brittany